The 2016–17 Taça de Portugal was the 77th season of the Taça de Portugal, the premier knockout competition in Portuguese football. It was also known as Taça de Portugal Placard due to sponsorship by sports betting game Placard.

The competition was contested by a total of 155 clubs, including teams from the top-three tiers of the Portuguese football league system and representatives of the fourth-tier District leagues and cups. It began with the first-round matches on 3 September 2016 and concluded on 28 May 2017, with the final at the Estádio Nacional in Oeiras.

The title holders were Braga, who won the competition for the second time after beating Porto in the previous final, but were eliminated in the fifth round by Sporting da Covilhã.

Format 
As in the previous season, the competition format is organised in a knockout system consisting of seven rounds before the final match. The concept of repechage introduced in the previous edition was kept, meaning that teams eliminated in one round could still compete in later rounds, to provide an even number of teams necessary to avoid byes.

A total of 120 teams entered the tournament in the first round, 79 competing in the third-tier Campeonato de Portugal and 41 representatives from the District Football Associations. In the second round, the previous round winners will be joined by the 17 teams competing in the second-tier LigaPro. In the third round, the 18 top-tier Primeira Liga teams will enter the competition for the first time, playing against the 46 winners of the second round. In both second and third rounds, teams from higher tiers will play away against teams from lower tiers; after the third round, the draw will have no restrictions.

Unlike the earlier one-legged rounds, the semi-finals will be played as two-legged ties, with home and away matches. The final will be played as a one-off match at a neutral venue, traditionally the Estádio Nacional in Oeiras.

Teams 
A total of 155 teams competing in the top-four tiers of Portuguese football plus the winners (or losing finalists) of the District Football Association Cups were considered eligible by the Portuguese Football Federation to participate in the competition:

Schedule 
All draws are held at the FPF headquarters at Cidade do Futebol, in Oeiras. Match kick-off times are in WET (UTC+0) from the fourth round to the semi-finals, and in WEST (UTC+1) during the rest of the competition.

First round 
A total of 120 teams from the Campeonato de Portugal (CP) and the District Football Associations (D) entered the first round. The draw took place on Wednesday, 10 August 2016, at 15:00 WEST. The teams were divided into eight groups of 14 or 16 teams according to geographic criteria. Matches were played on 3 and 4 September 2016.
 

Fixtures

Series A
 Pedras Salgadas (CP) 1–0 Bragança (CP)
 Merelinense (CP) 3–0 Cerveira (D)
 Vilar de Perdizes (D) 0–3 Vilaverdense (CP)
 Ponte da Barca (CP) 1–0 Montalegre (CP)
 Mirandela (CP) 2–2   Maria da Fonte (D)
 Atlético dos Arcos (D) 1–0  Torcatense (CP)
 Águia de Vimioso (D) 1–5 Limianos (CP)

Series B
 Cerva (D) 0–2 Amarante (CP)
 Trofense (CP) 5–0 Caniçal (CP)
 AD Oliveirense (CP) 8–1 Sendim (D)
 Joane (D) 0–0   Barrosas (D)
 Cruzado Canicense (D) 1–4 Pedras Rubras (CP)
 Camacha (CP) 1–1   Felgueiras 1932 (CP)
 Aliança de Gandra (CP) 0–1 Santa Eulália (D)
 São Martinho (CP) 6–0 Raimonda (D)

Series C
 Cinfães (CP) 4–0 Sporting de Espinho (D)
 Sanjoanense (CP) 4–2  Salgueiros (CP)
 Cesarense (CP) 1–1   Moimenta da Beira (CP)
 Coimbrões (CP) 3–0 Gondomar (CP)
 Torre de Moncorvo (CP) 1–1   Aguiar da Beira (D)
 Valadares Gaia (D) 2–0 Sousense (CP)
 Trancoso (D) 0–2 Oliveirense (CP)

Series D
 Lusitano de Vildemoinhos (CP) 3–1 Sátão (D)
 Estarreja (CP) 4–1 Pampilhosa (CP)
 Mortágua (CP) 1–0 AD Nogueirense (CP)
 Penalva do Castelo (D) 2–2   Académica – SF (CP)
 Recreio de Águeda (CP) 3–2  Tourizense (CP)
 Gafanha (CP) 1–1   Anadia (CP)
 Gouveia (CP) 0–4 Beira-Mar (D)

Series E
 Fátima (CP) 2–0 Carapinheirense (CP)
 Académico do Fundão (D) 0–1 Vitória de Sernache (CP)
 Vinha da Rainha (D) 1–4 Alcanenense (CP)
 Sertanense (CP) 1–0 Marinhense (D)
 Benfica e Castelo Branco (CP) 8–0 Naval 1º de Maio (CP)
 União de Leiria (CP) 10–0 Gavionenses (D)
 Alcains (D) 2–0 Oleiros (CP)
 Ginásio de Alcobaça (CP) 1–0 Sourense (D)

Series F
 Loures (CP) 2–1 Vilafranquense (CP)
 Cartaxo (D) 2–2   Mosteirense (D)
 Sporting de Lourel (D) 1–2 Beneditense (D)
 Sintrense (CP) 0–1 Gafetense (CP)
 Torreense (CP) 1–0 Mafra (CP)
 Santa Iria (D) 2–1 Atlético da Malveira (CP)
 Fazendense (D) 0–3 Caldas (CP)

Series G
 Sporting Ideal (CP) 0–2 Praiense (CP)
 Sacavenense (CP) 4–0 Atlético CP (CP)
 Real (CP) 3–0 Rabo de Peixe (D)
 Lusitânia (CP) 2–3 1º de Dezembro (CP)
 Barreirense (CP) 2–1  Operário (CP)
 Angrense (CP) 1–0 São Roque (Açores) (D)
 Flamengos (D) 0–4 Oriental (CP)
 Casa Pia (CP) 2–2   Fabril do Barreiro (CP)

Series H
 Lusitano VRSA (CP) 3–0 Louletano (CP)
 Armacenenses (CP) 6–1 Redondense (D)
 Pinhalnovense (CP) 2–0 Lagoa (D)
 Almancilense (CP) 1–0 Amora (D)
 Sporting de Viana do Alentejo (CP) 3–0 Quarteirense (D)
 Moura (CP) 2–0 Beira-Mar de Almada (D)
 Praia de Milfontes (D) 1–4 Mineiro Aljustrelense (CP)
 Lusitano de Évora (D) 0–2 Farense (CP)

Second round 
A total of 92 teams participated in the second round, comprising the 60 winners of the previous round, the 17 non-reserve teams competing in the 2016–17 LigaPro (II), and 15 teams randomly drawn from among the first-round losers (repechage). The draw took place on Thursday, 8 September 2016, at 15:30 WEST. Matches were played on 24 and 25 September 2016. LigaPro sides played their matches away against lower division opponents.

Repechage
The following 15 first-round losing teams were selected to compete in the second round:

 Anadia (CP)
 Barrosas (D)
 Casa Pia (CP)
 Cerva (D)
 Gavionenses (D)
 Gouveia (CP)
 Lusitano de Évora (D)
 Naval 1º de Maio (CP)
 Pampilhosa (CP)
 Rabo de Peixe (D)
 São Roque (Açores) (D)
 Sendim (D)
 Sousense (CP)
 Sporting de Lourel (D)
 Vilafranquense (CP)

Fixtures

Third round 
A total of 64 teams participated in the third round, which included the 46 winners of the previous round and the 18 teams competing in the 2016–17 Primeira Liga (I). The draw took place on Thursday, 29 September 2016, at 17:30 WEST. Matches were played on 13, 14, 15 and 16 October 2016. Similarly to what occurred with LigaPro teams in the previous round, Primeira Liga sides played their matches away against lower division teams.

Fixtures

Fourth round 
A total of 32 teams participate in the fourth round, all of which advanced from the previous round. The draw took place on Friday, 21 October 2016, at 12:00 WEST, and unlike previous rounds, was free of restrictions. Matches were played on 13, 17, 18, 19 and 20 November 2016.

Fixtures

Fifth round 
A total of 16 teams participated in the fifth round, all of which advanced from the previous round. The draw took place on Thursday, 24 November 2016, at 15:00 WET. Matches were played on 14–15 December 2016.

Fixtures

Quarter-finals 
A total of eight teams participated in the quarter-finals, all of which advanced from the previous round. The draw took place on Tuesday, 20 December 2016, at 15:00 WET. Matches were played on 17–18 January 2017.

Fixtures

Semi-finals 
The semi-final pairings were determined on Tuesday, 20 December 2016, at 15:00 WET, following the draw for the quarter-finals. This round was contested over two legs in a home-and-away system; the first legs were played on 1 March and the second legs were played on 5 April 2017.

Fixtures

Benfica won 5–4 on aggregate.

3–3 on aggregate. Vitória de Guimarães won on away goals.

Final

Notes

References

External links
Official webpage 

Taça de Portugal seasons
Portugal
Cup